Slavko Janevski (January 11, 1920, Skopje - January 20, 2000) was a Macedonian poet, prose and script writer. He was also active as a comics artist. He finished high school in Skopje. From 1945 onwards he was the editor of the first teenage magazine called "Pioneer". Janevski is the author of the first novel to be written in Macedonian, . As script writer he adapted the historical drama "Macedonian bloody wedding" in 1967. Janevski received many awards, among others "AVNOJ" 1968 and "Makedonsko slovo" for the book Thought. He is considered to have laid the foundations of the Macedonian literature.

In memory of his work, on January 29, 2010, in the park "Zena borec" in Skopje was unveiled a monument to him, the work of academic sculptor Tome Serafimovski.

In 2013, the Lustration Commission of Republic of Macedonia announced that it had concluded that Slavko Janevski was a collaborator of the Yugoslav communist secret services, spying on artists and writers with the pseudonym "Slavjan." This resulted in sharp reactions and non-acceptance of the decision by the Macedonian Academy of Sciences and Arts, Writers' Association of Macedonia, and the wider Macedonian public.

The Council of the City of Skopje declared 2020 the year of Slavko Janevski, in honor of the centenary of his birth.

Biography
Janevski was born in Skopje, where he graduated from primary and vocational school. Since 1945 he has been the editor of the first Macedonian children's newspaper "Pioneer", and then he was the editor-in-chief of several literary magazines, such as: the children's magazine "Titovce", the magazines for literature and art "Nov den" and "Sovremenost", the literary newspaper "Horizon" and the humorous-satirical newspaper "Osten". In the meantime he worked as an editor in the publishing houses "Kočo Racin", "Nasha kniga" and "Makedonska kniga".

In 1946, in Skopje, he, Blaze Koneski, Aco Šopov, Vlado Maleski and Kole Čašule formed the Writers' Association of Macedonia, which at that time had 7 members. After that, Janevski was also the president of the Association. He was also a member of the Macedonian PEN Center, President of the SPE Council, as well as a member of the Macedonian Academy of Sciences and Arts since its establishment in 1967.

Janevski also left a mark in Macedonian cinema, as the author of several film scripts: in 1967, he adapted the classic historical play by Voydan Chernodrinski, "Macedonian Blood Wedding", directed by Trajce Popov; collaborated with Pande Tashkovski on the film adaptation of the epic war novel "Dosledni na zavetot", renamed "Makedonski del od pekolot", directed by Vatroslav Mimica; and adapted his own humanistic novel "Dve Marii" for the film entitled "Jazol", directed by Kiril Cenevski.

References

External links

Biography of Slavko Janevski from MANU (in Macedonian)  
"Pesni" (1944-1948)
"Milioni Džinoi"
Excerpt from „Cudotvorci“

1920 births
2000 deaths
Writers from Skopje
Macedonian poets
Macedonian writers
Macedonian screenwriters
Macedonian film directors
Macedonian short story writers
Macedonian artists
Macedonian comics artists
Yugoslav poets
Golden Arena winners
20th-century short story writers
Film people from Skopje
20th-century screenwriters